The Sand River is a river of Minnesota, United States.  It is a tributary of the Stony River.

See also
List of rivers of Minnesota

References

Rivers of Minnesota